In the 1772 English cricket season, it became normal practice to complete match scorecards and there are surviving examples from every subsequent season. Scorecards from 1772 have been found for three eleven-a-side matches in which the Hampshire county team played against an England team, and for one top-class single wicket match between Kent and Hampshire. The three Hampshire v England matches have been unofficially recognised by certain sources as first-class, although no such standard existed at the time. Prior to 1772, only four scorecards have survived, the last from a minor match in 1769.

Hampshire won two and lost one of their matches against England. Kent won the single wicket match. Hampshire teams were organised by the Hambledon Club and played their home matches on Broadhalfpenny Down, near the village of Hambledon, Hampshire. John Small, the Hampshire batsman, scored the most runs in the three scored matches; no details of bowling or fielding have survived.

While details are scarce, reports exist of four other eleven-a-side matches. Two involved a combined Hampshire and Sussex team playing against Kent and it has been suggested that Hambledon may have been a two counties club. There was a match between Surrey and Hampshire of which only the result is known. In the north of England, the Sheffield and Nottingham clubs met at an unknown venue in Sheffield.

Scorecards
The earliest known scorecards were created for two matches in 1744 but, before 1772, only two more have been found – one each from minor matches played in 1751 and 1769. Three scorecards exist from top-class matches played in 1772, when completion became normal practice, and there are surviving cards from every subsequent season.

Hampshire v England, Broadhalfpenny Down, 24–25 June
In the match at Broadhalfpenny Down on 24–25 June, Hampshire won by 53 runs for a stake of 500 guineas. Hampshire teams were organised by the Hambledon Club and one source for this match has called the team Hambledon while, in other accounts, the England team has been called "Kent, Middlesex and Surrey".

Hampshire had two given men: William Yalden and John Edmeads, both of Surrey. Yalden was a noted wicket-keeper and Hampshire's regular keeper Tom Sueter was also playing, but it is not known which of them kept wicket in this match. On the England side, Gill of Buckinghamshire is known to have been a wicket-keeper. Hampshire batsman John Small's score of 78 is the highest recorded in the 1772 season and, as such, it established the record for the highest individual score definitely recorded in a senior or top-class match. According to contemporary newspaper reports, "bets of £500 were laid against John Minshull in favour of John Small".

England v Hampshire, Guildford Bason, 23–24 July
The match at Guildford Bason on 23–24 July was also won by Hampshire, this time by 62 runs and again for a stake of 500 guineas. Richard Simmons of Kent was the England wicket-keeper in this match and the next one.

F. S. Ashley-Cooper calls the teams Hambledon and All England when referring to confusion about the extras: "In the course of the game, the Hambledon Club (sic) got 11 notches in byes and All-England (sic) 21, but they were not entered in the scoresheet". He gave the match scores as 144 and 118 to 117 and 73 with Hampshire winning by 72 runs; however, these totals have Hampshire scoring 12 byes and England scoring 22, which is the same as the scorecard (the margin excluding extras is correct).

England v Hampshire, Bourne Park, 19–20 August
The third match was played on 19–20 August at Bourne Paddock, Bishopsbourne, near Canterbury. England won by two wickets and the scorecard shows that Joseph Miller and John Boorman were the not out batsmen when the match ended, while Dick May did not bat. Yalden and Edmeads again played for Hampshire as given men. Hampshire's captain, all-rounder Richard Nyren, missed this match and was replaced by Thomas Ridge.

Arthur Haygarth noted that the England team in this match was called Kent in another account, though he called it England; the team included nine Kent players with Lumpy Stevens and Thomas White from Surrey.

Players

Many scorecards in the 18th century lack details and so it is difficult to create any analysis of playing performances. The three scorecards in 1772 provide only the team totals and the runs scored by each batsman. There is no bowling or fielding data. John Small of Hampshire scored the most runs with 213. William Yalden scored 136 for Hampshire as a given man and Joseph Miller of England scored 98.

A total of 28 players (12 for Hampshire; 16 for England) took part in the three matches. Hampshire's players were Edward Aburrow Jr, William Barber, Thomas Brett, John Edmeads, William Hogsflesh, George Leer, Richard Nyren, Thomas Ridge, John Small, Peter "Buck" Stewart, Tom Sueter and William Yalden. The England players were John Boorman, Childs, John Frame, James Fuggles, Gill, Dick May, Tom May, Joseph Miller, John Minshull, Page, William Palmer, Thomas Pattenden, Richard Simmons, Lumpy Stevens, Thomas White and John Wood.

Single wicket
A top-class five-a-side match was played under single wicket rules at the Artillery Ground on Tuesday, 2 June between teams representing Hampshire and Kent. It was a two innings match. Hampshire scored 11 and 46; Kent scored 35 and 23 for 4 wickets to win by one wicket. The Kent players were John Boorman, John Frame, Dick May, John Minshull and Joseph Miller. Minshull scored 26 and 11; Frame scored the winning run. The Hampshire players were John Small, Tom Sueter, George Leer, Thomas Brett and Richard Nyren. Nyren scored 29 out of 46 in the second innings.

Other events
Besides the scorecards of the three matches above, reports have survived of four more eleven-a-side matches in 1772.

After their first known meeting in 1771, the Sheffield and Nottingham clubs played a match on Monday, 1 June at an unknown location in Sheffield. Nottingham conceded defeat after being dismissed for 14 and then seeing Sheffield score 70 with wickets still in hand. A pre-match announcement appeared in the (Nottingham) Daily Messenger on Tuesday, 25 May, and the paper followed up with a report on Friday, 12 June.

In August, Kent played two matches against a combined Hampshire and Sussex team. The first, on 10–11 August, was at Broadhalfpenny Down and the combined team won by 50 runs. The stake was 500 guineas but, apart from the result, no details of the match are known. The second match, on 26–27 August, was played at Guildford Bason and Kent won by innings and 29 runs. In his notes about this match, G. B. Buckley says: "Hampshire & Sussex = Hambledon Club", adding weight to the theory that Hambledon was a two counties club. The bets placed seem to have been mainly around how many runs the Duke of Dorset would score compared with one Mr Ellis, a now unknown player. It is possible that this was a "gentlemen only" match and the same may be true of the match on 10 August. The report was in the General Evening Post on Saturday, 29 August.

On Friday, 28 August, there was a Surrey v Hampshire match at Guildford Bason which Hampshire won by 45 runs. No details are known except the result.

Two matches in June involved the Blackheath club against teams designated as counties but, as Buckley says, "the alleged Kent team cannot have been representative" and they are minor matches only. Another Kent match against a team called London and Middlesex apparently took place at the Artillery Ground on Tuesday, 11 August, the same day as the Hampshire and Sussex v Kent match above. It is believed that this was not a representative match, especially given the stakes on offer at Hambledon.

Notes

References

Bibliography

Further reading
 
 
 
 
 
 
 
 

1772 in English cricket
English cricket seasons in the 18th century